Aechmea phanerophlebia is a species of flowering plant in the Bromeliaceae family. This species is endemic to Brazil.

Cultivars
 Aechmea 'Tessie'

References

BSI Cultivar Registry Retrieved 11 October 2009

phanerophlebia
Flora of Brazil
Taxa named by John Gilbert Baker